"Minimum Love" is a song by American singer-songwriter Mac McAnally. It was released as a single in 1983 from his album Nothing But the Truth.

The song narrowly missed the Top 40 on the Billboard Hot 100, peaking at No. 41. However, it was a Top 10 Adult Contemporary hit in both the United States and Canada.

Reception
Some music critics have stated that McAnally had a voice similar to that of James Taylor. McAnally admitted it in an interview with Orange Coast, stating it was accidental.

Chart performance

References

1983 songs
1983 singles
Geffen Records singles
Mac McAnally songs
Songs written by Mac McAnally